Lillian Sarah Wilson (12 November 1864 – 1 March 1909) was a British archer who competed at the 1908 Summer Olympics in London. Wilson competed at the 1908 Games in the only archery event open to women, the double National round competition. She took eighth place in the event with 534 points.

References

External links
 Lillian Wilson's profile at Sports Reference.com
 
 

1864 births
1909 deaths
British female archers
Archers at the 1908 Summer Olympics
Olympic archers of Great Britain